Hvitträsk is a mansion complex in Kirkkonummi, Finland, about  west of Helsinki. It was designed as a studio home for the members of the Finnish architecture firm Gesellius, Lindgren, Saarinen, later becoming the private residence of Eliel Saarinen. It currently operates as a museum.

Description

The development it began when the plot was purchased by the company in 1901. The construction was mostly completed by 1903. The house was named after Lake , by which it was built. [H]vitträsk literally means White Lake. Today Hvitträsk is a museum open to the public. The red-roofed manor structure facing the lake is the main museum building, and the brownish structure separated on the other side by a yard is the cafeteria. There is also a smaller sauna down by the lake.

In 1922 Lindgren's home in the north side partially burned down. Eliel Saarinen's son Eero Saarinen designed a new building in its place in 1929–33.

Gallery

Featured in publications 
Moderne Bauformen 6, no. 4 (1907): 159–62;8, no. 8 (1909): 350, 353.
Hemma och Ute 3, (August 1913): 210–14; 3 (September 1913): 234–5.
American Architect and Architectural Review 124 (September 26, 1923): 19 pls.
Arkkitehti nos. 11–12 (1943): 24.
Architectural Review 139 (February 1966): 152–54.
Space Design no. 133 (September 1975): 91–94
Connaissance des Arts no. 238 (December 1971): 108–13, 192.
New York Times 13 February 1966, VI, p. 64.

References

External links 
Hvitträsk - official site
 

Houses in Finland
Kirkkonummi
Museums in Uusimaa
Historic house museums in Finland
National Romantic architecture in Finland